Verona High School may refer to:

Verona High School (Kentucky), Verona, Kentucky, listed on the NRHP in Boone County, Kentucky
Walton-Verona High School — Walton, Kentucky
Verona High School (Missouri) —  Verona, Missouri
Verona High School (New Jersey) —  Verona, New Jersey
Vernon-Verona-Sherrill High School — Verona, New York
Verona High School (North Dakota) —  Verona, North Dakota
Verona Area High School — Verona, Wisconsin